Potsdam, New York, relates to two locations in St. Lawrence County, New York:

Potsdam, New York
Potsdam (village), New York, in the town of Potsdam; site of the State University of New York at Potsdam

See also
Potsdam (disambiguation)